Hanover Township may refer to one of the following places in the State of Illinois:

 Hanover Township, Cook County, Illinois
 Hanover Township, Jo Daviess County, Illinois

See also

Hanover Township (disambiguation)

Illinois township disambiguation pages